Schlock is a 1973 American low-budget horror comedy film, written, directed by and starring filmmaker John Landis in his directorial debut.

Plot
Schlock is a prehistoric apeman who terrorizes Southern California. He emerges from his cavehole after a couple of teenagers venture into it. The police, under Detective Sgt. Wino, is informed where the creature lives, and Professor Shlibovitz ventures into the hole to study the habitat. Schlock returns to the cave, and after a few hijinks, the people realise what he is. The police tries to apprehend the creature, but are powerless. Schlock then ventures into the suburb. He is a menace to some, and a friend to others. He falls in love with the beautiful blind teenager Mindy. She is kind to Schlock at first, but after she regains her sight, is terrified of him. Her boyfriend Cal defends her against Schlock, by using a flare. Schlock later crashes a school-party, and takes Mindy to the roof of the building. Cal uses a flare to get Schlock to drop Mindy. A small army regiment then shoots down the apeman, using two rounds of ammunition. Mindy quotes Love Story; "Love means never having to say you're sorry", while a police officer quotes King Kong; "It was beauty that killed the beast". Sgt. Wino asks him; "What's wrong with you?". At the end, Professor Shlibovitz emerges from the cave, carrying Schlock's son, teasing the potential sequel "Son of Schlock".

Cast
 John Landis as Schlock
 Eliza Garrett as Mindy Blinerman
 Saul Kahan as Detective Sgt. Wino
 Joseph Piantadosi as Officer Ivan
 Richard Gillis as Officer Gillis
 Tom Alvich as Torn Cop
 Walter Levine as Police Thief
 Eric Allison as Joe Putzman
 Ralph Baker as Dying Man
 Gene Fox as Billy
 Susan Weiser-Finley as Betty (credited as Susan Weiser)
 Jonathan Flint as Bobby (credited as Jonathan A. Flint)
 Amy Schireson as Barbara
 Belinda Folsey as Gloria
 Emile Hamaty as Professor Shlibovitz (as E.G. Harty)
 Harriet Medin as Mrs. Blinerman (credited as Enrica Blankey)

Production

Shot in the summer of 1971, but not released until 1973, Schlock is the first credited film by John Landis, who also starred in the title role. The feature-length parody of 1950s monster movies was shot in 12 days in the Los Angeles area and had a budget of approximately $60,000, half of which came from Landis' personal savings. Aside from being Landis' first project as a director, the film is also notable for being one of the first jobs for makeup artist Rick Baker.

Release and reception
Landis could not find a distributor interested in releasing the film until 1972 when it came to the attention of Johnny Carson. Carson loved the film and booked Landis as a guest on The Tonight Show, where clips were shown. It subsequently got released theatrically in the United States by Jack H. Harris Enterprises. It opened in Hollywood in March 1973 and in West Germany on September 17, 1982.

The film eventually became a minor cult hit and helped pave the way for the careers of both John Landis and Rick Baker. However, Landis has described the film as "terrible". It holds a 71% score on Rotten Tomatoes.

Home media
The film was released on DVD by Anchor Bay Entertainment on October 2, 2001 and on Blu-ray by Arrow Films on October 16, 2018.

See also
 List of American films of 1973

References

External links
 

1973 films
American comedy horror films
1970s comedy horror films
1970s parody films
Films directed by John Landis
Films with screenplays by John Landis
1973 directorial debut films
1973 comedy films
Films shot in Los Angeles
1970s monster movies
American monster movies
1970s English-language films
1970s American films